Zenkaikon is a multi-genre convention held during spring at the Lancaster County Convention Center in Lancaster, Pennsylvania. The convention was formerly based around King of Prussia, Pennsylvania (a Philadelphia suburb). Zenkaikon's name is a portmanteau of Zentrancon (science-fiction convention) and Kosaikon (anime convention), created when they merged in 2006. The convention has an all-volunteer staff.

Programming
The convention typically offers anime and live action screenings, AMV's, artist alley, concerts, cosplay masquerade, costume competitions, dances, dealers room, formal costume ball, game shows, iron cosplay, karaoke, LARP, live bands, maid cafe, manga library, panels, tabletop gaming, vendors, video gaming, and workshops.

In 2015, the charity auction benefited the Lymphoma Research Foundation and raised over $1,800. The foundation was chosen due to the death of guest CJ Henderson from Lymphoma. In 2017, the charity auction benefited Ocean Conservancy. In 2018, the charity auction benefited The AbleGamers Foundation. 2019's charity was the Arch Street Center.

History
Zenkaikon was formed in 2006 by the merger of two Philadelphia-area events, Zentrancon and Kosaikon. In 2008, Zenkaikon became a two-day convention. In 2009 due to significant attendance growth, Zenkaikon moved to the larger Valley Forge Radisson Hotel (same complex as its former location the Scanticon) and capped attendance at 1,500 attendees per day. In 2010, Zenkaikon announced it would become a three-day convention, move to a spring date (skipping 2010), and increase convention space by using both the Valley Forge Convention Center and Scanticon Hotel and Conference Center (same complex). The changes were made to improve weather, allow for better preparation, and increase staff. During the convention in 2011, Zenkaikon and its attendees raised $3750 for the American Red Cross Japanese Earthquake and Pacific Tsunami Relief Fund. Due to construction of the Valley Forge Casino Resort at the Valley Forge Convention Center, Zenkaikon 2012 was held at a new location, The Greater Philadelphia Expo Center at Oaks, and reduced to two days.

Zenkaikon moved to the Lancaster County Convention Center for 2013 and returned to being a three-day event. The convention returned to the Lancaster County Convention Center in 2014 and occupied every (four) floor. Zenkaikon returned to the convention center in 2015, and 2016 for its 10th anniversary. In 2017, the convention used Tellus360's Temple Room for additional space. Zenkaikon 2020 was cancelled due to the COVID-19 pandemic. The convention held virtual programming on what was to be the Saturday of the event. Zenkaikon 2021 was also cancelled due to the COVID-19 pandemic, with an online event announced in its place. The convention's 2022 COVID-19 policies required masks and vaccination. Zenkaikon for the first time used both floors of Tellus360 for events.

Event history

Kosaikon Anifest
Kosaikon was an anime convention held from 2003 to 2005 on the campus of Villanova University. The convention featured anime screenings, artists' alley, an artist's gallery, cosplay contest, and video gaming with tournaments.

Event history

Zentrancon
Zentrancon was an anime and science fiction convention held on October 16, 2005 at The Rotunda, University of Pennsylvania. It was created by members of the Delaware Anime Society. The convention featured autograph sessions, costume contests, dealers, film screenings, raffles, tabletop gaming, and video game tournaments.

Event history

Collaborations
Zenkaikon staff provided anime and Asian content to America's Video Games Expo 2008 (VGXPO) at the Pennsylvania Convention Center, in Philadelphia, Pennsylvania on November 21–23, 2008. Content included screenings, panels, gaming tournaments, and karaoke. Zenkaikon returned to VGXPO 2009 on October 9–11, 2009 and provided two screening rooms for anime. Zenkaikon hosted a Cosplay Fashion Show in Fairmount Park during Sakura Sunday at the 2012 Subaru Cherry Blossom Festival of Greater Philadelphia.

References

External links
Zenkaikon Website

Multigenre conventions
Recurring events established in 2006
2006 establishments in Pennsylvania
Annual events in Pennsylvania
Anime conventions in the United States
Festivals in Pennsylvania
Tourist attractions in Lancaster County, Pennsylvania
Culture of Lancaster, Pennsylvania
Tourist attractions in Lancaster, Pennsylvania
Conventions in Pennsylvania